Anna Ptaszynski is a British podcaster, television host, and television writer. She is one of the four regular hosts of the podcast No Such Thing as a Fish, together with Dan Schreiber, Andrew Hunter Murray, and James Harkin. She was also a presenter of the BBC Two television show No Such Thing as the News, and she is a researcher and writer for the television show QI.

Early life and education
Ptaszynski is the oldest of four children. Her parents are Judith Terry and theatre impresario Andre Ptaszynski, who was Chief Executive of Andrew Lloyd Webber's Really Useful Group. She attended Oxford High School.

Career
Before working at QI and No Such Thing as a Fish, Ptaszynski worked in Scottish politics, Australian advertising, selling fruit wine, and hay-baling. Ptaszynski is a researcher, writer, and script-editor for the BBC quiz show QI.

Ptaszynski has been one of the four regular hosts of the podcast No Such Thing as a Fish since it was launched as a spinoff of the BBC quiz show QI in March 2014. Five years later, at the end of 2019, episodes of No Such Thing as a Fish had been downloaded over 250 million times, with 1.5 million listeners every week. Ptaszynski has gone on several national and international tours to record live episodes of No Such Thing as a Fish.

Ptaszynski was a co-author of three books published by the podcast's co-hosts: The Book of the Year 2019, The Book of the Year 2018, and The Book of the Year 2017. Along with the other main hosts of No Such Thing as a Fish, Ptaszynski hosted No Such Thing as the News, a BBC Two television program based on the podcast.

Facts shared by Ptaszynski on No Such Thing as a Fish have been cited in media outlets Daily Express, and she has published facts in The Telegraph. Ptaszynski has been noted for her dry humour on the podcast. 

Ptaszynski was the curator for the 17th series of the Radio 4 show Museum of Curiosity, which she co-hosted its creator John Lloyd.

Episode 467 of No Such Thing as a Fish, released in February 2023, was Ptaszynski's last episode of the podcast before her temporary departure for maternity leave.

References

British podcasters
British women podcasters
British television writers
British women television writers
Living people
Date of birth missing (living people)
Year of birth missing (living people)